Kin On is an at-grade MTR Light Rail stop located at the junction of Pui To Road and Kin On Street in Tuen Mun District. It began service on 18 September 1988 and belongs to Zone 2. It serves nearby industrial buildings.

References

MTR Light Rail stops
Former Kowloon–Canton Railway stations
Tuen Mun District
Railway stations in Hong Kong opened in 1988